The 2020 Supermarket Heroes 500 is a NASCAR Cup Series race that was originally scheduled to be held on April 5, 2020 and was rescheduled to May 31, 2020, at Bristol Motor Speedway in Bristol, Tennessee. Contested over 500 laps on the  concrete short track, it was the ninth race of the 2020 NASCAR Cup Series season. The race was won by Brad Keselowski after Joey Logano and Chase Elliott wrecked as Elliott got loose and hit Logano coming off turn 4 with 3 laps to go.

Report

Background

Bristol Motor Speedway, formerly known as Bristol International Raceway and Bristol Raceway, is a NASCAR short track venue located in Bristol, Tennessee. Constructed in 1960, it held its first NASCAR race on July 30, 1961. Despite its short length, Bristol is among the most popular tracks on the NASCAR schedule because of its distinct features, which include extraordinarily steep banking, an all concrete surface, two pit roads, and stadium-like seating.

Due to the COVID-19 pandemic, the race was moved from its original April 5 date to May 31. Sponsor K-VA-T Food Stores Inc. also rebranded the event to the "Food City presents the Supermarket Heroes 500" to honor grocery store workers during the pandemic.  The event was held behind closed doors with ticketholders later given the option of exchanging the tickets for later events, including the 2020 NASCAR All-Star Race that is to be held at Bristol at 20% capacity.

Entry list
 (R) denotes rookie driver.
 (i) denotes driver who are ineligible for series driver points.

Qualifying
Brad Keselowski was awarded the pole for the race as determined by a random draw.

Starting Lineup

Race

Stage Results

Stage One
Laps: 125

Stage Two
Laps: 125

Final Stage Results

Stage Three
Laps: 250

Race statistics
 Lead changes: 21 among 7 different drivers
 Cautions/Laps: 17 for 102
 Red flags: 1 for 11 minutes and 35 seconds
 Time of race: 3 hours, 19 minutes and 2 seconds
 Average speed:

Media

Television
Fox Sports covered their 20th race at the Bristol Motor Speedway. Mike Joy and five-time Bristol winner Jeff Gordon covered the race from the Fox Sports studio in Charlotte. Matt Yocum handled the pit road duties. Larry McReynolds provided insight from the Fox Sports studio in Charlotte.

Radio
PRN had the radio call for the race which will was simulcasted on Sirius XM NASCAR Radio. Doug Rice, Mark Garrow called the race in the booth when the field raced down the frontstretch. Rob Albright called the race from atop the turn 3 suites when the field raced down the backstretch. Brad Gillie, Brett McMillan and Wendy Venturini covered the action on pit lane.

Standings after the race

Drivers' Championship standings

Manufacturers' Championship standings

Note: Only the first 16 positions are included for the driver standings.
. – Driver has clinched a position in the NASCAR Cup Series playoffs.

References

Supermarket Heroes 500
Supermarket Heroes 500
Supermarket Heroes 500
NASCAR races at Bristol Motor Speedway
Supermarket Heroes 500